Mastersystem were a British rock supergroup composed of two sets of brothers, who were members of the groups Frightened Rabbit (including the late Scott Hutchison), Editors and Minor Victories. They released their debut album, Dance Music, on 6 April 2018 to critical acclaim. The band began a UK tour supporting the album in April 2018. Further summer dates and a plan for a wider tour later in the year were halted after the passing of Scott Hutchison in May.

Mastersystem released the music video for their final single, "Old Team", in November 2018.

Origin 
The Scottish indie rock band Frightened Rabbit recorded their fourth studio album, Pedestrian Verse, in a house in the Scottish Highlands in 2012. During this time, brothers Scott and Grant Hutchison of Frightened Rabbit befriended Justin and James Lockley of Hand Held Cine Club, who asked if they could accompany Frightened Rabbit and record their album process. 

Upon release of Dance Music, Scott confided that the band had originally been named "Old Team" in acknowledgement all four band members being timed served artists in the music industry.

Members
Scott Hutchison – guitar, vocals (Frightened Rabbit) (d. 2018)
Grant Hutchison – drums (Frightened Rabbit)
Justin Lockey – guitar (Editors, yourcodenameis:milo)
James Lockey – bass (Minor Victories)

Song Writing 
The band worked on the instrumental and lyrical writing processes separately, with Scott penning the lyrics only after tracks had been developed by the other members of the band (Grant, Justin and James). This is in contrast to other projects fronted by Scott (Frightened Rabbit and Owl John), where Scott was a core element of the instrumental song writing.

Discography
Dance Music (Physical Education Recordings, 2018)

References

British rock music groups
Sibling musical groups
Musical groups established in 2017
Musical groups disestablished in 2018
Rock music supergroups
2017 establishments in the United Kingdom
2018 disestablishments in the United Kingdom